Cornwall Partnership NHS Foundation Trust provides community health services to children and young people and mental health and learning disability services to people of all ages across Cornwall, England. It runs Longreach House in Redruth, and Bodmin Hospital.

In 2006, the Commission for Social Care Inspection and the Healthcare Commission mounted a joint investigation into widespread institutional abuse of people with learning difficulties in the Trust.

In August 2014, it was revealed that the Trust was considering a merger with Peninsula Community Health and that the Chief Executive of Royal Cornwall Hospitals NHS Trust was also interested in participating.

In January 2018, the trust said it was owed £2.1m by Cornwall Council under the contract for adult community services which it took over in April 2016.

It set up a new unit, Cove Ward at Longreach in Redruth in March 2018 as a fast-track rehabilitation service, and to avoid patients being sent out of the area.

Debbie Richards, the chief executive, announced in May 2022 that almost half of the community hospital beds were occupied by patients who have no medical need to be in hospital but could not be discharged because of the shortage of adult social care provision, especially  specialist dementia placements, for which there was particularly low capacity in Cornwall.

See also

 Healthcare in Cornwall
 List of NHS trusts

References

External links
 

NHS foundation trusts
Health in Cornwall
NHS mental health trusts